La cambiale is a 1959 Italian comedy film directed by Camillo Mastrocinque.

Plot 
Commander Bruscatelli, before being imprisoned, leaves the Posalaquaglia cousins a bill of exchange which they give to Temistocle Bisogni in compensation for the damage they have committed in his tobacco shop. This letter undergoes opposition, passes from hand to hand before returning to Bisogni who passes it to Posalaquaglia in exchange for false testimony. The two are arrested and find Bruscatelli, who renews the bill of exchange with another equivalent.

Cast 
Totò: Antonio Posalaquaglia 
Peppino De Filippo: Peppino Posalaquaglia 
Macario: Tommaso La Candida 
Vittorio Gassman: Michele, the "coiffeur pour chien"
Sylva Koscina: Odette Mercury 
Ugo Tognazzi: Alfredo Balzarini 
Georgia Moll: Maria, Ottavio's sister  
Raimondo Vianello: Olimpio 
Paolo Ferrari: Ottavio 
Aroldo Tieri: Commendator Pierluigi Bruscatelli
Lia Zoppelli: la proprietaria della Ilaria boutique
Luigi Pavese: Cav. Temistocle Bisogni 
Toni Ucci:  Manager of Ursus 
Andrea Bosic: Prince Alessio 
Olimpia Cavalli: Enrichetta 
Gina Rovere: Lola Capponi 
Mario Castellani: Lawyer Incarta 
Eduardo Passarelli: il pretore
Giacomo Furia: il cancelliere

References

External links

1959 films
Films directed by Camillo Mastrocinque
Italian comedy films
1959 comedy films
1950s Italian films